Koschey: The Everlasting Story is a full-length animated Russian fantasy film directed by Andrey Kolpin, and stars the voice of Nikita Volkov, Irina Starshenbaum, Timur Rodriguez, and Arseny Perel. It is part of the universe of the popular cartoon franchise Fantasy Patrol.

The film was theatrically released in Russia on October 28, 2021 by KaroProkat (KaroRental in English).

Plot 
In ancient times, people and fabulous creatures lived together. Until the White Ghost, a ruthless monster capable of destroying the whole world, came to the Divnozemskoye principality. But only one hero can stop the monster. He is young, strong, handsome, and also drives a bike... His name is Koschey.

Cast 
 Nikita Volkov as Koschey the Immortal (Koschei)
 Irina Starshenbaum as May
 Timur Rodriguez as Sword Kladenets (Swordy)
 Arseny Perel as Bao
 Yuri Galtsev as Vodyanoy
 Pavel Barshak as Prince Beloyar
 Vladislav Vetrov as Likho
 Irina Medvedeva as Yadviga Petrovna (Baba Yaga)
 Yulia Zimina as Vasilisa Vasilievna
 Miroslava Karpovich as Helena  
  as Valery 
 Yuliya Aleksandrova as Mary 
 Polina Kutepova as Snowy
  as Basilio the Cat
 Daniil Eldarov as Guards
  as narrator

Production
In August 2017, on the air of the Radio Mayak radio station, the general director of the Parovoz Animation Studio (ru) by Anton Smetankin said that the studio had begun to create a full-length version, which is originally scheduled to release in 2020, but it was delayed to 2021 due to the COVID-19 pandemic.

References

External links
 Official website (in Russian)
 

2021 computer-animated films
Russian animated fantasy films
Films postponed due to the COVID-19 pandemic
2021 films
2021 animated films
Russian children's fantasy films
Films about magic and magicians
2020s children's animated films
2020s children's fantasy films
2020s fantasy adventure films
Russian fantasy adventure films